The 2018–19 NorthEast United FC season was the club's fifth season since its establishment in 2014 and their fifth season in the Indian Super League.

Players

Current squad

Transfers

Loan return and Retained players

In

Pre-season and friendlies

NorthEast United was rumoured to travel to Sweden for its preseason. The tour was cancelled and the club continued their preparations in India itself playing against teams like I-League champion Minerva Punjab and runner up NEROCA.

Indian Super League

Results summary

1st Half: Results by round

2nd Half: Results by round

1st Half: Matches

2nd Half: Matches

Semi-finals

Leg-1

Leg-2

Indian Super Cup

Round of 16

Quarter-finals

Management
.

Squad statistics

|-
|colspan="14"|Players who left NorthEast United during the season:

|}

Top scorers

Disciplinary record

References

NorthEast United FC seasons
NorthEast